James George Alexander Bannerman Carnegie, 3rd Duke of Fife (23 September 1929 – 22 June 2015) was a British landowner, farmer and peer. He was the grandson of Louise, Princess Royal, a daughter of King Edward VII and Queen Alexandra. As a female-line great-grandson of a British sovereign, he did not carry out royal or official duties or receive any funds from the Civil List. He was the second cousin of Queen Elizabeth II and Princess Margaret, Countess of Snowdon, and King Harald V of Norway. Through his maternal grandfather, he was also a descendant of William IV and Dorothea Jordan.

Early life
The Duke was the only son of the 11th Earl of Southesk (1893–1992) and his wife, Princess Maud (1893–1945), the younger daughter of the 1st Duke of Fife and Louise, Princess Royal. One of his godparents was George V, his mother's maternal uncle, who was represented at the christening by his eldest son and heir, the Prince of Wales.

The Duke was educated at Ludgrove, Gordonstoun School, and at the Royal Agricultural College, Cirencester. He served with the Scots Guards in Malaya in 1948–50. He served as vice patron of the Braemar Royal Highland Society and of the British Olympic Association.

Duke of Fife
The Dukedom of Fife was first granted in 1889 to the Duke's grandfather, the 6th Earl of Fife, by Queen Victoria on his marriage to Princess Louise of Wales, the eldest daughter of the Prince of Wales. In April 1900, the first Duke received a new patent as Duke of Fife and Earl of Macduff in the Peerage of the United Kingdom, this time with a special remainder to his daughters by Princess Louise and their male issue. As the only surviving children of the Duke and Princess Louise were two daughters, the dukedom passed to Princess Alexandra of Fife, who became Princess Arthur of Connaught.

On 26 February 1959, the duke succeeded his maternal aunt, Princess Arthur of Connaught, Duchess of Fife, as Duke of Fife and Earl of Macduff, because her only child, Alastair, 2nd Duke of Connaught and Strathearn, had predeceased her. On 16 February 1992 the third Duke also succeeded his father as Earl of Southesk and as chief of the Clan Carnegie.

He lived at Elsick House, on his estate near Stonehaven in Kincardineshire and also farmed the family estate around Kinnaird Castle, Brechin.  His interests included sports cars, driving a Ford Zephyr 6 in the 1955 Monte Carlo Rally.

Tsar Nicholas II 
In the 1990s, Fife's mitochondrial DNA (mDNA) was used to help identify bones recovered in Siberia in 1979 as the remains of Tsar Nicholas II of Russia, who was killed in 1918 by the Communists along with his wife and children. Queen Alexandra, the Duke of Fife's maternal great-grandmother, was the older sister of Nicholas II's mother, Dagmar. The test required a female line descendant, as mDNA is passed unchanged from mother to child, unless there is a mutation. In Fife's case, mDNA from Queen Alexandra passed to his grandmother, Louise, Princess Royal, and then to his mother, Princess Maud, and then to him. Fife's mDNA was a 98.5% match with the bones, a rare imperfect match that scientists suspected was caused by a genetic mutation on the Russian side called a heteroplasmy. In 1994, the remains of Nicholas's younger brother, Grand Duke Georgy Alexandrovich, were exhumed in Saint Petersburg. The mDNA from Grand Duke Georgy also revealed the heteroplasmy, confirming the theory of the mutation and conclusive proof that the bones indeed belonged to the last tsar of Russia.

Marriage and family

As a young man, the Duke's name was variously linked with Princess Margaret, ballerina Mary Drage, and sportswoman Divina Galica.

On 11 September 1956, the then Lord Carnegie married The Hon. Caroline Dewar (born 12 February 1934), the elder daughter of the 3rd Baron Forteviot at St Ninian's Cathedral, Perth, Scotland.  Guests at the wedding included Queen Elizabeth The Queen Mother.  The reception was held at the Dewar family residence, Dupplin Castle.

The marriage produced three children before they divorced in 1966: 
 Son (stillborn 4 April 1958)
 Lady Alexandra Clare Carnegie (born 20 June 1959), who married Mark Fleming Etherington on 11 May 2001. They have one daughter:
 Amelia Mary Etherington (born 24 December 2001).
 David Carnegie, 4th Duke of Fife (born 3 March 1961), who married Caroline Anne Bunting on 16 June 1987, and succeeded as the 4th Duke of Fife in 2015. They have three sons, including Charles Duff Carnegie, Earl of Southesk (born 1989), heir to the dukedom.

Other titles
In addition to being 3rd Duke of Fife, he was also:
 12th Earl of Southesk (Peerage of Scotland)
 3rd Earl of Macduff (Peerage of the United Kingdom)
 12th Lord Carnegie of Kinnaird (Peerage of Scotland)
 12th Lord Carnegie, of Kinnaird and Leuchars (Peerage of Scotland)
 4th Baron Balinhard of Farnell in the County of Forfar (Peerage of the United Kingdom)
 9th Carnegie Baronet (Baronetage of Nova Scotia)

Ancestry

Arms

See also
 Carnegie (disambiguation)

References

External links

1929 births
2015 deaths
Dukes of Fife
Scottish clan chiefs
People educated at Gordonstoun
People educated at Ludgrove School
Alumni of the Royal Agricultural University
Scots Guards officers
British Army personnel of the Malayan Emergency
20th-century Scottish businesspeople
Fife